Abgineh (also Romanized as Ābgīneh) is a village in Rivand Rural District, in the Central District of Nishapur County, Razavi Khorasan Province, Iran. In the 2006 census, it was first mentioned, despite not having its population reported.

See also 

 List of cities, towns and villages in Razavi Khorasan Province

References 

Populated places in Nishapur County